Inquisitor armillatus is a species of sea snail, a marine gastropod mollusk in the family Pseudomelatomidae, the turrids and allies.

Description
The length of the shell attains 16 mm.

Distribution
This marine species occurs off the Philippines.

References

 Stahlschmidt P. & Fraussen K. (2014) Two new turrid species (Gastropoda: Pseudomelatomidae) from the Palawan region, the Philippines. Zootaxa 3784(1): 89-93.page(s): 91

External links
 Gastropods.com: Inquisitor armillatus

armillatus
Gastropods described in 2014